Daniel Paul Schreber (25 July 1842 – 14 April 1911) was a German judge who was famous for his personal account of his own experience with schizophrenia. Schreber experienced three distinct periods of acute mental illness. The first of these, in 1884-1885 was what was then diagnosed as dementia praecox (later known as paranoid schizophrenia or schizophrenia, paranoid type). He described his second mental illness, from 1893 to 1902, making also a brief reference to the first disorder from 1884 to 1885, in his book Memoirs of My Nervous Illness. The Memoirs became an influential book in the history of psychiatry and psychoanalysis because of its interpretation by Sigmund Freud.
There is no personal account of his third disorder, in 1907–1911, but some details about it can be found in the Hospital Chart (in the Appendix to Lothane's book). During his second illness he was treated by Prof. Paul Flechsig (Leipzig University Clinic), Dr. Pierson (Lindenhof), and Dr. Guido Weber (Royal Public Asylum, Sonnenstein).

Schreber's experiences
Schreber was a successful and highly respected judge until middle age when the onset of his psychosis occurred. He woke up one morning with the thought that it would be pleasant to "succumb" to sexual intercourse as a woman. He was alarmed and felt that this thought had come from somewhere else, not from himself. He even hypothesized that the thought had come from a doctor who had experimented with hypnosis on him; he thought that the doctor had telepathically invaded his mind. He believed his primary psychiatrist, Prof. Paul Flechsig, had contact with him using a "nerve-language" of which Schreber said humans are unaware. He believed that hundreds of people's souls took special interest in him, and contacted his nerves by using "divine rays", telling him special information, or requesting things of him. During one of his stays at the Sonnenstein asylum, he concluded that there are "fleeting-improvised-men" in the world, which he believed were divinely fabricated men, as miracles to provide Schreber with "play-with-humans" in light of a depopulation of the world.

As his psychosis progressed, he believed that God was turning him into a woman, sending rays down to enact 'miracles' upon him, including little men to torture him. Schreber was released from psychiatric hospitals around 1902, shortly before the publication of his book. He resumed his private activities, which he conducted very well up until 1907, when his mother died. He then went through a final hospitalisation. Schreber died on 14 April 1911 in the Leipzig-Dosen asylum.

Schreber's book 
The fundamental unit of Schreber's ruminations were what he called "nerves", which were said to compose both the human soul and the nature of God in relation to humanity. Each human soul was composed of nerves that derived from God, whose own nerves were then the ultimate source of human existence. Schreber's thought that God's nerves and those of humanity existed parallel to one another except when the "Order of the World" was violated which constituted the fundamental premise of Schreber's memoirs, in which the two universes experienced dangerous "nerve-contact" with each other. For Schreber, this was focused upon his personal and institutional relationship with Dr. Flechsig, who became a rebellious "nerve specialist" by virtue of his psychiatric power in contrast to the "Omnipotence" of God.

The peculiar universe of Schreber's was mediated by the activity of rays, which could assume a "pure" and "impure" relation; these rays could be controlled by Flechsig or emanated strictly from God, who sought to influence Schreber and his reality by "divine miracles". The rays had the capacity for independent activity, though they were distinguished from souls and nerves (generally identical) which emanated from other human beings deceased or living. Within Schreber's cosmology the universe as an observable reality, and the Sun especially, was a partially independent realm which God merely communicated through, using rays and miracles to influence at times when the "Order of the World" needed to be adjusted. Strictly speaking, God only initiated nerve-contact with human beings through dreams or inspired states (in poetry, etc.), or when humans had become corpses and returned to the "forecourts of Heaven" after purification to rejoin the 'nerve soul' of God. However, the entire crisis which Schreber describes in his book is the dangerous combination between humanity and God within the mind of Schreber.

Schreber's ruminations can be schematized in this way:

God - Upper and lower (Ormuzd and Ahriman respectively, derived from Persian theology)
The "forecourts of Heaven" - The "states of Blessedness" where deceased humans' souls reside after a process of "purification" (These are called the "anterior realms of God" in contradistinction to the "posterior" realms which consist of the upper and lower Gods)
The Universe - Separated from the transcendental sphere of God providing the human/material world and yet threatening God's invested existence within it; celestial bodies allow the means for God's life/light to interact with His creations
Divine rays - Semi-sentient entities (which are the cosmic fuel of God's Omnipotence, and influence Schreber and the world but can be manipulated by Flechsig)
Nerves/Souls - The spiritual bodies of humans which are active whether the living person is alive or dead, and go through various states of purification in order to return to God's nerves in a "state of Blessedness"

There is no Hell in Schreber's cosmology.

Freud's interpretation and its criticisms

Although Freud never interviewed Schreber himself, he read his Memoirs and drew his own conclusions from it in an essay entitled "Psycho-Analytic Notes on an Autobiographical Account of a Case of Paranoia (Dementia Paranoides)" (1911). Freud thought that Schreber's disturbances resulted from repressed homosexual desires, which in infancy were oriented at his father and brother. Repressed inner drives were projected onto the outside world and led to intense hallucinations which were first centred on his physician Dr. Flechsig (projection of his feelings towards his brother), and then around God (who represented Schreber's father, Daniel Gottlob Moritz Schreber). During the first phase of his illness Schreber was certain that Dr. Flechsig persecuted him and made direct attempts to murder his soul and change him into a woman (he had what Freud thought to be emasculation hallucinations, which were in fact, according to Schreber's words an "unmanning" (Entmannung) experience. In the next period of his ailment he was convinced that God and the order of things demanded of him that he must be turned into a woman so that he could be the sole object of sexual desire of God. Consideration of the Schreber case led Freud to revise received classification of mental disturbances. He argued that the difference between paranoia and dementia praecox is not at all clear, since symptoms of both ailments may be combined in any proportion, as in Schreber's case. Therefore, Freud concluded, it may be necessary to introduce a new diagnostic notion: paranoid dementia, which does justice to polymorphous mental disturbances such as those exhibited by the judge.

Freud's interpretation has been contested by a number of subsequent theorists, most notably Gilles Deleuze and Félix Guattari in their work Anti-Oedipus and elsewhere. Their reading of Schreber's Memoirs is a part of their wider criticism of familial orientation of psychoanalysis and it foregrounds the political and racial elements of the text; they see Schreber's written experience of reality abnormal only in its honesty about the experience of power in late capitalism. Elias Canetti also devoted the closing chapters of his theoretical magnum opus Crowds and Power to a reading of Schreber. Finally, Jacques Lacan's Seminar on the Psychoses and one of his écrits "On a Question Prior to Any Possible Treatment of Psychosis" are predominantly concerned with reading and evaluating Schreber's text over-against Freud's original and originating interpretation.

Schatzman's interpretation
In 1974, Morton Schatzman published Soul Murder, in which he gave his own interpretation of Schreber's psychosis. Schatzman's interpretation was based on W. G. Niederland's research from the 1950s. (Niederland had previously worked with survivors of Nazi concentration camps.) Schatzman had found child-rearing pamphlets written by Moritz Schreber, Daniel Schreber's father, which stressed the necessity of taming the rebellious savage beast in the child and turning him into a productive citizen. Many of the techniques recommended by Moritz Schreber were mirrored in Daniel Schreber's psychotic experiences. For example, one of the "miracles" described by Daniel Schreber was that of chest compression, of tightening and tightening. This can be seen as analogous to one of Moritz Schreber's techniques of using an elaborate contraption that confined the child's body, forcing him to have a "correct" posture at the dinner table. Similarly, the "freezing miracle" might mirror Moritz Schreber's recommendation of placing the infant in a bath of ice cubes beginning at age three months. Daniel Paul Schreber's older brother, Daniel Gustav Schreber, committed suicide in his thirties. In his 1989 book Schreber: Father and Son, Han Israëls argued against the interpretations of Niederland and Schatzman, claiming that Schreber's father had been unfairly criticized in the literature.

Lothane's interpretation
Henry Zvi Lothane argued against the interpretations of Niederland and Schatzman in his 1992 book, In Defense of Schreber: Soul Murder and Psychiatry. Lothane's Schreber research included the study of archival records concerning the relationship between Schreber and the other significant people in his life, including his wife and his doctors. On Lothane's account, the existing literature on Schreber as a rule (1) leaves substantial gaps in the historical records, which careful archival research could in some measure fill, (2) leaves out psychoanalytically significant relationships, such as that between Schreber and his wife, and (3) overstates the purportedly sadistic elements in Schreber's father's child-rearing techniques. Lothane's interpretation of Schreber also differs from previous texts in that he considers Schreber a worthwhile thinker.

In popular culture
 Schreber's Memoirs are the starting point and main topic of the 1972 radio play Schreber's Nervous Illness by British playwright Caryl Churchill.
 Roberto Calasso's first book, and only novel, L'impuro folle (1974), is about Schreber.
A character of the same name appears in the 1988 book Empire of the Senseless by Kathy Acker.
 A character of the same name appears in the 1998 film Dark City, played by Kiefer Sutherland.
 In the 2006 film Memoirs of My Nervous Illness, based on Schreber's 1903 journal of the same name, Schreber is portrayed by Jefferson Mays.
 The 2011 docudrama film, Shock Head Soul follows Schreber's demise and later life.
 Schreber is the first person narrator of Swedish writer Fabian Kastner's novel Lekmannen (The Layman, 2013).
 In Jenny Davidson's The Magic Circle: A Novel (2013), Lucy uses Memoirs of My Nervous Illness as a text for the seminar she is teaching on "Madness and Literature."
 The song "Dementia Praecox" from the 2014 album White Deer Park by Papa vs Pretty is about Daniel Paul Schreber.
 Schreber is the subject of British writer Alex Pheby's novel Playthings, (2015).
 BBC documents record that Anthony Burgess wrote in 1975 for Burt Lancaster a screenplay of Schreber's Memoir.  Never filmed, it was adapted for radio and performed by Christopher Eccleston 22 March 2020.
 The two dominant organizations in the anime franchise Neon Genesis Evangelion are named NERV and SEELE, German for Nerve and Soul, likely alluding to Schreber's cosmology.

References

Further reading

David B. Allison et al., "Psychosis and Sexual Identity: Toward a Post-Analytic View of the Schreber Case": State University of New York Press, Albany, NY, 1988. A collection of essays by theorists such as Michel de Certeau, Alphonso Lingis, Jean-François Lyotard, as well as several previously unpublished texts written by Schreber after the publication of the Memoirs.
Elias Canetti: Crowds and Power: New York: Farrar, Straus and Giroux: 1984.
Thomas Dalzell: Freud's Schreber: Between Psychiatry and Psychoanalysis: London: Karmec: 2011.
Han Israëls: Schreber: Father and Son: Madison: International Universities Press: 1989 [1981]. Translated by H. S. Lake from the Dutch Schreber: Vader en Zoon: Historisch-kritische opmerkingen over een psychoanalytisch beschreven geval van paranoia.
Erin Labbie & Michael Uebel: "We Have Never Been Schreber:  Paranoia, Medieval and Modern," in The Legitimacy of the Middle Ages: On the Unwritten History of Theory. Ed. Andrew Cole & D. Vance Smith. Durham, NC:  Duke University Press, 2010. 127–58.
Jacques Lacan: 'The Psychoses: The Seminar of Jacques Lacan Book III, 1955-56', Routledge. An analysis of Schreber's Memoirs in the context of Freud's analysis. "[P]sychosis is a special but emblematic case of language entrapment."
Jacques Lacan: 'On a Question Prior to Any Possible Treatment of Psychosis', Écrits: The First Complete Edition in English, transl. by Bruce Fink, New York: W.W. Norton & Co., 2006.
William G. Niederland: The Schreber Case: Psychoanalytic Profile of a Paranoid Personality: New York: Quadrangle: 1974.
Eric Santner: My Own Private Germany: Daniel Paul Schreber's Secret History of Modernity Princeton University Press, Princeton, NJ, 1996.
Louis Sass: The Paradoxes of Delusion: Wittgenstein, Schreber, and the Schizophrenic Mind Cornell University Press: 1994.
Morton Schatzman: Soul Murder: Persecution in the Family Random House, New York, 1973. 
Anke Junk: Macht und Wirkung eines Mythos - die mythenhaften Vorstellungen des Daniel Paul Schreber. Hannover, Impr. Henner Junk 2004. 
Alexander van der Haven: "The War and Transcendental Order: Critique of Violence in Benjamin, Canetti and Daniel Paul Schreber" in Tel Aviver Jahrbuch für deutsche Geschichte 43 (2015): 115–144.
Alexander van der Haven: "God as Hypothesis: Daniel Paul Schreber and the Study of Religion" in Method and Theory in the Study of Religion: Working Papers from Hannover. Supplements to Method and Theory in the Study of Religion 8. Ed. Steffen Führding. Leiden/Boston: Brill, 2017. 176–98.
Alexander van der Haven: "Beyond the Modern Self: Madness and Divine Communion in fin-de-siècle Germany" in Religion und Wahnsinn um 1900: Zwischen Pathologisierung und Selbstermächtigung. Religion and Madness Around 1900: Between Pathology and Self-Empowerment. Diskurs Religion: Beiträge zur Religionsgeschichte und religiösen Zeitgeschichte 14. Ed. Lutz Greisiger, Sebastian Schüler, Alexander van der Haven. Baden-Baden: Ergon, 2017. 69–100.

External links
Saxon Psychiatric Museum collected documents about life history of the court president Daniel Paul Schreber.
 Daniel Paul Schreber: A Guide to Memoirs of My Nervous Illness. An introduction to Schreber's work.

1842 births
1911 deaths
Case studies by Sigmund Freud
People with schizophrenia
19th-century German judges